Rapur is a Big  town and a Mandal in SPSR Nellore district in the Indian state of Andhra Pradesh.
Rapur is one of the major panchayats located in the Nellore district of Andhra Pradesh, India and soon going to become as a municipality by 2020 as state government approved for it.

Rapur became famous nationwide recently as it possess longest electrified railway tunnel line in India which is of 6.6 km long. It was opened by vice president M. Venkaiah Naidu on Aug 21, 2019. This line lies between krishnapatnam port and cheropali, currently serving only for goods and soon passenger services will be available. Rapur will become Railway Junction with 4 routes by 2022 when other line of Nadikudi to Srikalahastri project completes.

Kandaleru dam, the longest earth dam is also in Rapur mandal. The dam is a part of Telugu Ganga project which is a key water source channel for Chennai. Fishes of a kind from this dam are being exported to Kerala, Chennai in available seasons

The surroundings forest and land have rich mica resources.

Geography
Rapur is located at 14.2000°N 79.5167°E. It has an average elevation of 90 meters (298 feet). Rapur comes under Nellore district and has a border with Kadapa district. Rapur town is surrounded by very big hills named veligonda which makes it a sightseeing place especially in winter and rainy seasons. Agriculture plays a vital role and rice as a major crop.

Amaravati is the state capital located 351 kilometers from Rapur. Other state's capitals which are near to Rapur are Chennai at a distance of 148.2 km, Bangalore 252.2 km, Pondicherry 253.7 km.

The surrounding nearby villages and its distance from Rapur are Pangili 3.0 km, Nellepalle 5.0 km, Yepuru 6.0 km, Thumaya 7.7 km, Gilakapadu 8.8 km, Gundavolu 8.8 km, Jorepalle 9.6 km, J.A Puram 14.5 km, Akilavalasa 11.7 km, Sanayapalem 14.6 km, Khambhalapalle 16.5 km, Gonupalli 17.0 km, M.v.puram, .

Demographics
Total population of Rapur Mandal is 44,424 living in 10,367 Houses, Spread across total 58 villages and 21 panchayats . Males are 22,306 and Females are 22,118.

Temperature
The maximum temperature is 36-46c during summer and the minimum temperature is 23-25c during winter. The rainfall ranges from 700 to 1000 mm through South West and North East Monsoons

Connectivity Details
Rapur have an APSRTC Bus stand and depot, recently got railway station too which is near from maddelamadu center. Tirupathi Airport is the nearest one which is at a distance 73 km.

Tourist Places
Kandaleru Dam at a distance of 18.7
Sivakona Waterfalls at a distance of 11.4 km
Penchalakona Waterfalls at a distance of 27 km
Penchalakona Temple distance of 26.7 km
Sight seeing of Attractive Hills and Reserved forest Area which starts just 1.4 km away from town

Pilgrimages 
Rapur has surrounded by many holiest places and pilgrimages like Penchalakona, Tirumala, Sri Kalahastri. Penchalakona is very famous for Sri Lakshmi Narasimha Swami temple.

Language
The languages spoken in Rapur are Telugu, Urdu, English. People live very close to each other irrespective of religion, so almost everyone can understand and speak Urdu here tough Telugu is official state language here.

Colleges
Animal Husbandry Polytechnic Rapur was established during September 2007, under the esteemed Sri Venkateswara Veterinary University at Bojjanapalle, Rapur mandal, Nellore district. This college has an administrative building, separate classrooms for first and second years, laboratory, museum, library, staff quarters, playground in addition to separate boys and girls hostel in an area of 29.56 acres. Newly constructed farms are available separately for cattle, sheep, goats and poultry for demonstration of farm activities to students. The first six batches of students were admitted at Rapur during 2007 – 2014 and the college was shifted from Rapur to a 30-acre nearby land during April, 2014. The first principal of the college was Dr. K. Sarjan Rao and the present principal of the college is Dr. P. Venkateswara Rao.

Administration
Police Station

Fire Station

Hospital

Government High School

Government Junior college

Government Degree College

Mandal Revenue Office

Government Urdu School

Uppar Primary schools(3)

State Bank of India with ATM

syndicate bank

Pinkini Grameena Bank

APSRTC

Substation

Mandal Parishat Office

Post Office

Social Welfare Office

Bharat Sanchar Nigam Limited

Public Library

Urdu Library

Education

GEMS 

Good Sheppard English Medium School

G.P Narasimham English Medium School

Simhapuri English Medium High School

Lakshmi Vidyanikatan

Karunamayi Vidyalayam

Madhava English Medium School

North school

Politics
Rapur (Assembly constituency)|Rapur was an assembly constituency of the Andhra Pradesh Legislative Assembly, India until 2008. Right now after delimitation is in  Venkatagiri Assembly constituency of Andhra Pradesh. 166,411 voters were registered in the Rapur constituency during the 1999 elections.

Elected Members:
 1972 - Nuvvula Venkataratnam Naidu, Indian National Congress
 1978 - Nuvvula Venkataratnam Naidu Indian National Congress
 1983 - Malireddy Adinarayana Reddy, Telugu Desam Party
 1985 - Anam Ramnarayana Reddy,  Telugu Desam Party
 1989 - Nuvvula Venkataratnam Naidu - Indian National Congress
 1994 - Y. Sreenivasulu Reddy, Telugu Desam Party
 1999 - Anam Ramnarayana Reddy- Indian National Congress
 2004 - Anam Ramnarayana Reddy- Indian National Congress
In 2009 Mr.Ramakrishna.K has elected as a M.L.A for venkatagiri assembly constitution.
This Assembly Constituency are Marge at Venkatagiri Assembly Constituency from 2009 in General Election

Villages in Rapur Mandal
Rapur

Kandaleru Dam

Tegacherla

Penubarthi

Gonupallu

Penchalakona

sydadupalli

Yepuru

masidupeta

marlapudi

vepinapi

pangili

velugonu

Momin Gunta

Siddavaram

Cherlopalli

Jorepalli

Thanamcherlla

References 

Towns in Nellore district